Ballynahinch United Football Club is a Northern Irish, intermediate football club playing in Division 1B of the Northern Amateur Football League. The club is based in Ballynahinch, County Down, and was formed in 1968 and celebrated their 40th anniversary this season. As well as the first team, there is a second team playing in the NAFL Division 3D and a third team in the Newcastle and District League Division 1.

Club history
The club formed in 1968 originally playing in the Newcastle and District League. They quickly joined the Northern Amateur Football League in the 1970s and have since risen to Division 1B. They have also had cup success in the Border Cup and Clarence Cup.

Honours

Intermediate honours
Clarence Cup: 1
1996–97
Border Cup: 1
1981–82

External links
 Ballynahinch United Official Club website
 nifootball.co.uk - (For fixtures, results and tables of all Northern Ireland amateur football leagues)

Association football clubs in Northern Ireland
Association football clubs established in 1968
Association football clubs in County Down
Northern Amateur Football League clubs
1968 establishments in Northern Ireland